Akichkin Pochinok is a rural locality (a village) in Bestuzhevskoye Rural Settlement of Ustyansky District, Arkhangelsk Oblast, Russia. The population was 47 as of 2010.

Geography 
Akichkin Pochinok is located on the Veryuga River, 100 km northeast of Oktyabrsky (the district's administrative centre) by road. Andreyev Pochinok is the nearest rural locality.

References 

Rural localities in Ustyansky District